William Webb Ferguson (May 22, 1857 – March 30, 1910) was the first African-American man elected to the Michigan House of Representatives.

Early life 
Ferguson was born in Detroit, Michigan, to Joseph and Martha Ferguson. His father, Joseph Ferguson, was a doctor. In 1876, Ferguson graduated with honors from Detroit High School as the first African-American child to attend public high school in Detroit. In 1883, he founded the Ferguson Printing Company.

Personal life 
Ferguson married Emma Virginia Pelham who born in Petersburg, Virginia, on August 20, 1878. Together, they had three children, Mattie, who died at the age of two, and Meta and Norine, who lived into adulthood.

State supreme court case 
After discrimination faced in a restaurant on August 15, 1889, Ferguson sued the restaurant manager, Edward G. Gies, in Wayne County Circuit Court. After losing this case, he appealed it to the Michigan Supreme Court in 1890 and won, the first case of racial discrimination in the state of Michigan.

Political career 
Ferguson was sworn in as member of the Michigan House of Representatives from Wayne County 1st district on January 4, 1893. He served until December 31, 1896. Ferguson was a member of the Republican Party.

Death
Ferguson died on March 30, 1910, in Detroit. He was interred on April 2, 1910, at the Elmwood Cemetery.

Legacy 
On February 28, 2018, a portrait of Ferguson painted by Joshua Adam Risner was unveiled at the Michigan State Capitol by the Michigan Legislative Black Caucus due to a bill introduced by State Representative Sheldon Neeley.

References 

1857 births
1910 deaths
African-American state legislators in Michigan
Politicians from Detroit
African-American history in Detroit
Burials at Elmwood Cemetery (Detroit)
Republican Party members of the Michigan House of Representatives
African-American men in politics
19th-century American politicians
20th-century African-American people